Amirabad (also Romanized as Amīrābād) is a village in Qezel Gechilu Rural District, in the Central District of Mahneshan County, Zanjan Province, Iran. At the 2006 census, its population was 279, in 63 families.

References 

Populated places in Mahneshan County